Peep Show is a Canadian television series, which aired on CBC Television in 1975 and 1976. The series, a 16-episode anthology of half-hour drama programs by new and emerging Canadian writers and directors, was produced by George Bloomfield and Gerald Mayer.  The eleven programs produced by Bloomfield leaned more to experimentation, while the five produced by Mayer were more in the vein of traditional television.

Programs that aired on Peep Show included Martin Lavut's Melony, Clarke Mackey's Fight Night, David Cronenberg's The Lie Chair and CODCO's Festering Forefathers and Running Sons. Martin Short also had one of his earliest television appearances on the series, in the episode Goldberg is Waiting.

The show was not renewed for a second season due to budget constraints.

References

External links

1970s Canadian anthology television series
CBC Television original programming
1975 Canadian television series debuts
1976 Canadian television series endings
1970s Canadian drama television series